Capunti is a kind of short convex oval pasta resembling an open empty pea pod.

See also
 List of pasta

References

Pasta
Italian cuisine